Maicol Berretti (born 1 May 1989) is a Sammarinese footballer who plays as a midfielder for Libertas.

Berretti made his senior national team debut on 21 November 2007, in an UEFA Euro 2008 qualifier match against Slovakia.

External links
 
 

Sammarinese footballers
San Marino international footballers
1989 births
Living people
S.S. Pennarossa players
A.S.D. Victor San Marino players
Association football midfielders
P.D. Castellarano players
Campionato Sammarinese di Calcio players